Love From London is the nineteenth studio album by Robyn Hitchcock, released on March 5, 2013, on the label Yep Roc Records.

Track listing

Reception
The album was well received by critics: according to Metacritic, the album has received an average review score of 77/100, based on 16 reviews.

References

2013 albums
Robyn Hitchcock albums
Yep Roc Records albums